Where Was I? is a 1925 American silent comedy film directed by William A. Seiter and starring Reginald Denny. Based upon a short story by Edgar Franklin, it was produced and distributed by Universal Pictures under their Jewel banner.

Plot
As described in a film magazine reviews, Thomas Berford, so successful in business that he has but one rival, George Stone, announces that he will marry Alicia, who is Stone’s daughter. Furious, Stone threatens to break him, and hires Claire, an adventuress, who tells Berford that he married her on January 9, 1923. Berford starts out to prove an alibi, but learns that the man who knows where he was on the date named is in Africa. However, he finds a suitcase full of money. Berford works to keep Alicia and Claire from meeting each other. His troubles multiply when his fake wife installs herself in his home. When his sweetheart meets the adventuress, it seems that he is to be arrested. However, the other woman tells of the frameup and he and Alicia are married.

Cast

Preservation
A print of Where Was I? is preserved at the Filmmuseum a.k.a. EYE Institut in Amsterdam.

References

External links

Amusing lobby poster

American silent feature films
Films directed by William A. Seiter
Universal Pictures films
Films based on short fiction
1925 comedy films
Silent American comedy films
American black-and-white films
1920s American films